The Grand Prix Nommay is a cyclo-cross race held in Nommay, France, which is part of the UCI Cyclo-cross World Cup competition.

Past winners

Men

Women

References
 Men's results
 Women's results

External links

UCI Cyclo-cross World Cup
Cyclo-cross races
Cycle races in France
Recurring sporting events established in 1978
1978 establishments in France